Myungshin University was a university located in Suncheon, Jeollanam-do, South Korea. It was shut down by the Korean government in 2011 following "serious corruption and irregularities"

References

External links
Myungshin University

Suncheon
Educational institutions established in 2000
Educational institutions disestablished in 2012
Defunct universities and colleges in South Korea
2000 establishments in South Korea